Tonkpi Region is one of the 31 regions of Ivory Coast. Since its establishment in 2011, it has been one of three regions in Montagnes District. The seat of the region is Man and the region's population in the 2021 census was 1,387,909, predominantly of Dan (Yacouba) ethnicity.

Tonkpi is currently divided into five departments: Biankouma, Danané, Man, Sipilou, and Zouan-Hounien.

Notes

 
Regions of Montagnes District
States and territories established in 2011
2011 establishments in Ivory Coast